Elections to Tower Hamlets London Borough Council took place on 22 May 2014, the same day as other United Kingdom local elections, the election of the directly elected mayor of Tower Hamlets, and the European Parliament elections. Voting in Blackwall & Cubitt Town Ward was postponed due to the death of a candidate. The Mayoral election is particularly notable for the voiding of the result due to widespread corruption.

As of 6 March 2017 the composition of the Borough Council was: 
22 Labour, 9 Independent Group Councillors, 5 Peoples Alliance of Tower Hamlets, 5 Conservatives, 3 Independents and 1 Liberal Democrat.

Reduction in council size

The Tower Hamlets (Electoral Changes) Order 2013 reduced the size of the Council and created new electoral wards.

The Local Government Boundary Commission for England began the process of changing the size of Tower Hamlets Council in 2012. The new wards for the elections in 2014 are as follows.

Results by ward

Bethnal Green East

Bethnal Green West

Blackwall & Cubitt Town

Bow East

Bow West

Bromley North

Bromley South

Canary Wharf

Island Gardens

Lansbury

Limehouse

Mile End

Poplar

Shadwell

Spitalfields & Banglatown

St Dunstan's

St Katharine's & Wapping

Stepney Green

Weavers

Whitechapel

2014–2018 by-elections 

A by-election for the ward of Stepney Green was held on 11 June 2015, after the sitting councillor, Alibor Choudhury, was found guilty of corrupt and illegal practices by an election court.

A by-election for the ward of Whitechapel was held on 2 December 2016, after the sitting councillor, Shahed Ali, was found guilty of housing fraud. Another independent candidate, Ahmed Shafi, won the seat.

Results

Mayor

Council

References

2014
Tower Hamlets
21st century in the London Borough of Tower Hamlets